Fernando Grijalba (born 14 January 1991) is a Spanish professional racing cyclist riding for .

Major results
2009
 1st  Junior National Time Trial Championships
2014
 7th Klasika Primavera
2017
 3rd Overall Tour de Filipinas
1st Stage 3

References

External links
 

1991 births
Living people
Spanish male cyclists
Sportspeople from Valladolid
Cyclists from Castile and León
21st-century Spanish people